The plant known as Salvia uliginosa, the bog sage, is a species of flowering plant in the family Lamiaceae, native to southern Brazil, Uruguay, and Argentina. It was described and named by botanist George Bentham for its typical habitat "of swamps and marshes", or uliginosa.

Description
The plant quickly spreads on underground runners and is readily divided.

They grow in whorls beginning in summer until fall, with many flowers coming into bloom at the same time.

Cyanosalvianin, the blue pigment from the flowers of S. uliginosa, is a metalloanthocyanin, a complex formed of six molecules of the anthocyanin type, six molecules of the flavone type and two magnesium ions.

Cultivation
Salvia uliginosa was introduced into horticulture in 1912, and has become popular in gardens and public landscapes for its azure-blue flowers, ability to grow under various conditions, and its pollinator habitat attributes.

This plant has gained the Royal Horticultural Society's Award of Garden Merit.

References

External links

uliginosa
Flora of Brazil
Flora of Argentina
Flora of Uruguay
Garden plants of South America
Drought-tolerant plants